The 2013 FIBA Asia Under-16 Championship for Women is the qualifying tournament for FIBA Asia at the 2014 FIBA Under-17 World Championship for Women. The tournament was held in Colombo, Sri Lanka from November 23 to November 30. Sugathadasa Indoor Stadium was the main venue for the entire tournament.

China defeated Japan in the finals, 62–50 to notch their second title, while Korea thrashed Chinese Taipei in the battle for Third Place, 86–64. China, Japan and Korea will represent FIBA Asia at the 2014 FIBA Under-17 World Championship for Women which will be held in Slovakia.

The championship was divided into two levels: Level I and Level II. The two lowest finishers of Level I met the top two finishers of Level II to determine which teams qualified for the top Level of the 2015 Championship. The losers were relegated to Level II.

Participating teams

Level I

Level II

Qualifying round 
Winners are promoted to Level I of the 2015 FIBA Asia Under-16 Championship for Women.

Final round 
Top three teams qualify to the 2014 FIBA Under-17 World Championship for Women.

Semifinals

3rd place

Final

Final standing

Awards

References 

2013
2013 in women's basketball
2013–14 in Asian basketball
International sports competitions hosted by Sri Lanka
2013 in Sri Lankan sport
2013 in youth sport